Nathan Birnbaum (pseudonyms: "Mathias Acher", "Dr. N. Birner", "Mathias Palme", "Anton Skart", "Theodor Schwarz", and "Pantarhei"; 16 May 1864 – 2 April 1937) was an Austrian writer and journalist, Jewish thinker and nationalist. His life had three main phases, representing a progression in his thinking: a Zionist phase (c. 1883 – c. 1900); a Jewish cultural autonomy phase (c. 1900 – c. 1914) which included the promotion of the Yiddish language; and religious phase (c. 1914–1937) when he turned to Orthodox Judaism and became staunchly anti-Zionist.

He married Rosa Korngut (1869–1934) and they had three sons: Solomon (Salomo) Birnbaum (1891–1989), Menachem Birnbaum (1893–1944), and Uriel Birnbaum (1894–1956).

Early life 
Birnbaum was born in Vienna into an Eastern European Jewish family with roots in Austrian Galicia and Hungary. His father, Menachem Mendel Birnbaum, a merchant, hailed from Ropshitz, Galicia, and his mother, Miriam Birnbaum (née Seelenfreund), who was born in northern Hungary (in a region sometimes called the Carpathian Rus), of a family with illustrious rabbinic lineage, had moved as a child to Tarnow, Galicia, where the two met and married.

From 1882 to 1886, Birnbaum studied law, philosophy and Near Eastern studies at the University of Vienna.

Zionism 
In 1883, at the age of 19, he founded Kadimah, the first Jewish (Zionist) student association in Vienna, many years before Theodor Herzl became the leading spokesman of the Zionist movement. While still a student, he founded and published the periodical Selbstemanzipation!, often written in large part by Birnbaum himself.  In it he coined the terms "Zionistic", "Zionist", "Zionism" (1890), and "political Zionism" (1892).

Birnbaum played a prominent part in the First Zionist Congress (1897) where he was elected Secretary-General of the Zionist Organization. He was associated with and was one of the most important representatives of the cultural, rather than political, side of Zionism. However, he left the Zionist Organization not long after the Congress. He was unhappy with its negative view of Diaspora Jewry and the transformation of the Zionist ideals into a party machine.

His next phase was to advocate Jewish cultural autonomy, or Golus nationalism, concentrating in particular on the Jews of eastern Europe. He advocated for the Jews to be recognized as a people among the other peoples of the empire, with Yiddish as their official language. He ran (in Buczacz, eastern Galicia) on behalf of the Jews (and with the support of the local Ukrainians) as candidate for the Austrian parliament. Although he had a majority of the votes, his election was thwarted by corruption of the electoral process by the local Polish faction.

He was chief convener of the Conference for the Yiddish Language held in Czernowitz, August 30 –September 3, 1908. It was the first Yiddish-language conference ever to take place. At the conference, he took the place of his colleague and fellow Yiddish activist Sholem Aleichem who was critically ill.

From about 1912 onwards, Birnbaum became increasingly interested in Orthodox Judaism, and he became a fully observant Orthodox Jew in about 1916. He continued to act particularly as an advocate for the Jews of eastern Europe and the Yiddish language. From 1919 to 1922, he was General Secretary of the Agudas Yisroel, a widely-spread and influential Orthodox Jewish organization. He founded the society of the "Olim" (Hebrew for the "Ascenders"), a society with a specific program of action dedicated to the spiritual ascent of the Jewish people.

Later life 
Birnbaum, decrying political Zionism, 1919:
And is it at all possible that we, who regard Judaism as our one and only treasure, should ever be able to compete with such expert demagogues and loud self-advertisers as they [the Zionists]? It is surely not necessary that we should. We are, after all, still the mountains and they the grain, and all we need to do is to gather all our forces in a world organization of religious Jews, and it will follow of itself, and without the application of any great political cunning on our part, that we shall have it in our power to prevent what must needs be prevented and to carry out what we have to carry out. But there is no need first to create this world organization of religious Jews. It is already in existence. The world knows its name, it is Agudas Yisroel [The Union of Israel].

He continued to write and lecture. His most well-known publication of this period of his life was "Gottes Volk", 1918 (German), "God's Folk", 1921 (Yiddish), translated into Hebrew as "Am Hashem" (1948), and translated into English under the title "Confession" (1946), slightly abridged.

In 1933, at the time of the Nazi rise to power, Birnbaum and his wife, together with their son Menachem (an artist) and family, who at that time were all living in Berlin, fled to Scheveningen, Netherlands, with the help of businessman and diplomat Henri B. van Leeuwen (1888-1973). There, Birnbaum, van Leeuwen, and banker Daniel Wolfe published the anti-Zionist newspaper Der Ruf ("The Call"). (Menachem and his family were murdered by the Nazis in 1944.) At the same time, their son Solomon (Professor of Yiddish and Hebrew paleography) and his family fled from Hamburg to England. Their other son, Uriel, an artist and poet, and his family fled from Vienna to the Netherlands in 1939. Van Leeuwen, also an Orthodox Jew, became a Dutch anti-Zionist leader and Bergen-Belsen survivor.

Birnbaum died in Scheveningen in 1937 after a period of severe illness.

Published works 
 "In bondage to our fellow Jews", 1919, from Nathan Birnbaum, Series of Essays on Agudas Yisroel, London, 1944, reproduced in Michael Selzer, editor, Zionism Reconsidered, Macmillan, London, 1970.
 Selbstemanzipation! Periodical. Vienna, 1885-1894. (ed., numerous articles). See above in text.
 Die jüdische Moderne; (Schulze) Leipzig, 1896,
 Ausgewählte Schriften zur jüdischen Frage, 2 Bände, 1910.
 Den Ostjuden Ihr Recht!; (Löwit) Vienna, 1915,
 Gottes Volk; (Löwit) Vienna, 1918,
 Um die Ewigkeit. Jüdische Essays; (Welt) Berlin, 1920,
 Im Dienste der Verheissung, Frankfurt 1927.
 Der Aufstieg (periodical); Berlin and Vienna, Jan. 1930 - Dec. 1932.
 Solomon A. Birnbaum (ed): The Bridge, London, 1956.
 Confession, New York, 1946. Translation (abridged) of Gottes Volk.
 From Freethinker to Believer in: Lucy Dawidowicz: The Golden Tradition, New York, 1967. Translation of Vom Freigeist zum Glaubigen, Zürich, 1919.
 Shloimy Birnboim (ed) Ais Laasys - Giklibene Ksuvim fun Nusn Birnboim, Lodz, 1939. (Yiddish). Selected essays.
 Die Freistatt (periodical). Eschweiler, 1913-1914. Numerous articles.
 An'iberblik iber maan lebn in: Orlean, Y.L. and Hasofer, N. (eds):Yubileyum Bukh zum zektsiktn Giburtstug fun Dr. Nusn Birnboim. Yeshurun, Warsaw, 1925. Yiddish.

See also 
 Theodor Herzl
 Timeline of Zionism

References

Further reading
 Michael Kühntopf-Gentz, Nathan Birnbaum. Biographie; Diss. Tübingen 1990. (In German.)
 Angelika M. Hausenbichl, Nathan Birnbaum. Seine Bemühungen um das jüdische Theater und die jüdische Kultur; Dipl.Arb. Wien 2001. (In German.)
 dies., Wirklich nur Politiker?; in: David. Jüdische Kulturzeitschrift 54, Wien (09/2002). (In German.)
 Joshua A. Fishman, Ideology, Society and Language. The Odyssey of Nathan Birnbaum; Ann Arbor (Karoma Publ.) 1987. (In English.)
 Solomon Birnbaum, Nathan Birnbaum; in: Leo Jung (ed.), Men of the Spirit, New York (Kymson Publ.) 1964. (In English.)
 S. A. Birnbaum, Nathan Birnbaum and National Autonomy; in: Josef Fraenkel (ed.), The Jews of Austria, London 1967, 1970. (In English+German.)

An essay on Nathan Birnbaum's activities within Orthodox Judaism - including information on the Olim ("Ascenders") - may be found at: "Der Aufstieg": Dr. Nathan Birnbaum ZT"L, Ascent and Agudah By Rabbi Yosef Gavriel Bechhofer.

 Jess Olson: Nation, Peoplehood and Religion in the Life and Thought of Nathan Birnbaum, Ph.D. Dissertation, Stanford University, USA, 2006.
 Jess Olson: Nathan Birnbaum and Tuvia Horowitz in: Jewish History 17, (pp 1–29), 2003.
  (also 1st edn., vol. 3, pp. 1040–1042, 1971).
 Shanes, Joshua: Birnbaum, Nathan in: The YIVO Encyclopedia of Jews in Eastern Europe, Vol. I, (pp 186–187), New Haven, 2008.
 Kaplan, A.E. & Landau, M. (eds): Vom Sinn des Judentums, Frankfurt/M. 1925.
 Orlean, Y.L. and Hasofer, N. (eds):Yubileyum Bukh zum zektsiktn Giburtstug fun Dr. Nusn Birnboim. Yeshurun, Warsaw, 1925. Yiddish.
 Wistrich, R.S.: The Metamorphosis of Nathan Birnbaum in: The Jews of Vienna in the Age of Franz Joseph, (1990).
 Wistrich, R.: The Strange Odyssey of Nathan Birnbaum in: Laboratory for World Destruction.Germans and Jews in Central Europe, Lincoln, Neb./Jerusalem, 2007.
 Nathan Birnbaum, “In bondage to our fellow Jews”, 1919 from Nathan Birnbaum, "Series of Essays on Agudas Yisroel", London, 1944 reproduced  in Michael Selzer, editor, “Zionism Reconsidered”, Macmillan, London, 1970.

External links
 The personal papers of Nathan Birnbaum are kept at the   Central Zionist Archives in Jerusalem. The notation of the record group is A188.
 First Yiddish Language Conference Tshernovits
 First Yiddish Language Conference By Nathan Birnbaum
 The Call, a digitized newspaper published by Birnbaum, at the Leo Baeck Institute, New York 

1864 births
1937 deaths
Writers from Vienna
Austrian Orthodox Jews
19th-century Austrian people
Jewish philosophers
Austrian philosophers
Austrian Zionists
Baalei teshuva
Yiddish-speaking people